1853 in sports describes the year's events in world sport.

Baseball
Events
 The New York Sunday Mercury publishes a box score for a Knickerbockers–Gothams baseball match, reprinted by the Clipper a few days later

Boxing
Events
 18 April — English champion Harry Broome defeats Henry Orme in the 31st round at Brandon to retain his title.
 August — a scheduled bout between Broome and former champion William Perry does not come off; Broome has to pay forfeit and Perry claims the title, but his claim is not recognised and Broome retains the English Championship until 1856.
 12 October — Yankee Sullivan and John Morrissey meet to decide the Heavyweight Championship of America at Boston Corners, New York.  According to reports, Morrissey is "badly beaten" but Sullivan leaves the ring after the 37th round and ignores the call of "time".  As a result, the referee awards the fight to Morrissey, who holds the American Championship until 1859.  Sullivan does not fight again but is subsequently arrested in San Francisco and sent to jail.
 Publication of the Revised London Prize Ring rules

Cricket
Events
 
England
 Most runs – Jemmy Dean 372 @ 12.82 (HS 62)
 Most wickets – James Grundy 87 @ 10.04 (BB 8–?)

Horse racing
 West Australian wins the English Triple Crown with a clean sweep of the 2000 Guineas, the Derby and the St Leger
England
 Grand National – Peter Simple (for the second time, having previously won in 1849)
 1,000 Guineas Stakes – Mentmore Lass 
 2,000 Guineas Stakes – West Australian
 The Derby – West Australian
 The Oaks – Catherine Hayes 
 St. Leger Stakes – West Australian

Rowing
The Boat Race
 The Oxford and Cambridge Boat Race is not held this year

References

 
Sports by year